Stephen Williams is a British ice dancer. He won the 1980 Nebelhorn Trophy with partner Wendy Sessions. He was the first coach of Kaitlyn Weaver.

Results
(with Wendy Sessions)

References

British male ice dancers
Living people
Year of birth missing (living people)